Elena Rybakina defeated Aryna Sabalenka in the final, 7–6(13–11), 6–4 to win the women's singles tennis title at the 2023 Indian Wells Open. It was her first  WTA 1000 title, and the final was a rematch of the Australian Open final, won by Sabalenka.

Iga Świątek was the defending champion, but lost in the semifinals to Rybakina.

Seeds 
All seeds received a bye into the second round.

Draw

Finals

Top half

Section 1

Section 2

Section 3

Section 4

Bottom half

Section 5

Section 6

Section 7

Section 8

Seeded players 
The following are the seeded players. Seedings are based on WTA rankings as of February 27, 2023. Rankings and points before are as of March 6, 2023.

† The player was not required to count points for the 2022 tournament due to a long-term injury exception. Points from her 16th best result will be deducted instead.
‡ The player did not qualify for the tournament in 2022. Points from her 16th best result will be deducted instead.

Withdrawn players
The following player would have been seeded, but withdrew before the tournament began.

Other entry information

Wildcards

Protected ranking

Withdrawals 
 Before the tournament

Qualifying

Seeds

Qualifiers

Lucky losers

Qualifying draw

First qualifier

Second qualifier

Third qualifier

Fourth qualifier

Fifth qualifier

Sixth qualifier

Seventh qualifier

Eighth qualifier

Ninth qualifier

Tenth qualifier

Eleventh qualifier

Twelfth qualifier

References

External links
 Main draw
 Qualifying draw

2023 WTA Tour
singles